Fabio Fulco (Bifulco) (born August 4, 1970, Naples, Italy)  is an Italian actor.

Biography 
Born August 4, 1970 in  San Giuseppe Vesuviano, Naples, Italy.

He started as an actor of Italian TV. Since 1998 —  in the movies. He played in 30 films and television series.

He appeared in films of famous directors —  Franco Zeffirelli, Dino Risi, Ruggero Deodato.

References

External links
 

1970 births
Living people
Male actors from Naples